Rhagades pruni is a species of moth of the family Zygaenidae. It is found in most of Europe (except for the British Isles) up to East Asia, including Japan.

The length of the forewings is 10–12 mm for males and 8–11 mm for females.

The larvae feed on Vaccinium uliginosum, Calluna vulgaris and Andromeda polifolia.

Subspecies
Rhagades pruni pruni
Rhagades pruni callunae Spuler, 1906

External links
Lepidoptera of Belgium
Lepiforum.de
Vlindernet 

Procridinae
Moths of Japan
Moths of Europe
Taxa named by Michael Denis
Taxa named by Ignaz Schiffermüller
Moths described in 1775